Sameer Zuberi is a physician at the Royal Hospital for Sick Children in Glasgow, Scotland, and Honorary Chair in Paediatric Neurology (School of Medicine, Dentistry & Nursing) at the University of Glasgow. He is also editor of a semi-monthly academic journal, European Journal of Paediatric Neurology and has served as president of the European Paediatric Neurology Society. He received the Ambassador for Epilepsy Award of the International League Against Epilepsy.

References

External links
Sameer Zuberi at Google Scholar

20th-century Scottish medical doctors
21st-century Scottish medical doctors
Academics of the University of Glasgow
Academic journal editors
Living people
Year of birth missing (living people)